Vanicela disjunctella, also known as the Titoki moth, is a moth of the family Roeslerstammiidae first described by Francis Walker in 1864. It is endemic to New Zealand.

References

Roeslerstammiidae
Moths of New Zealand
Taxa named by Francis Walker (entomologist)
Endemic fauna of New Zealand
Moths described in 1864
Endemic moths of New Zealand